Arthur Smith (28 May 1851 – 8 March 1923) was an English cricketer.  Smith was a right-handed batsman who bowled left-arm roundarm slow-medium.  He was born at Hurstpierpoint, Sussex.

Smith made his first-class debut for Sussex against Yorkshire in 1874 at the County Ground, Hove.  He made eighteen further first-class appearances for Sussex, the last of which came against Surrey in 1880.  Smith's role in a team was a bowler, in his nineteen first-class matches for Sussex he took 61 wickets at an average of 17.80, with best figures of 7/47.  These figures were one of three five wicket hauls he took and came against Surrey in 1876, a match in which he also took figures of 5/77 to claim his only haul of ten wickets in a match.  With the bat, he scored 94 runs at an average of 4.27, with a high score of 13.

He died at Amberley, Sussex, on 8 March 1923.  His brother, Charles, and nephew, also called Charles, played first-class cricket, as did his uncle Alfred Smith.

References

External links
Arthur Smith at ESPNcricinfo
Arthur Smith at CricketArchive

1851 births
1923 deaths
People from Hurstpierpoint
English cricketers
Sussex cricketers
People from Amberley, West Sussex